Vexillum deshayesii is a species of small sea snail, marine gastropod mollusk in the family Costellariidae, the ribbed miters.

The subspecies : Vexillum deshayesi alauda (Sowerby II, 1874) has become a synonym of  Vexillum (Costellaria) michaui (Crosse & P. Fischer, 1864).

Description
The shell size varies between 10 mm and 30 mm

Distribution
This species is distributed in the Red Sea, in the Indian Ocean along Chagos, the Mascarene Basin, Madagascar, Mauritius and Mozambique.

References

 Dautzenberg, Ph. (1929). Mollusques testacés marins de Madagascar. Faune des Colonies Francaises, Tome III
 Drivas, J. & M. Jay (1988). Coquillages de La Réunion et de l'île Maurice
 Turner H. 2001. Katalog der Familie Costellariidae Macdonald, 1860. Conchbooks. 1-100 page(s): 29
 Buijse J.A., Dekker H. & Verbinnen G. (2009) The identities of Mitra fidicula Gould, 1850, Mitra michaui Crosse & Fischer, 1864 and Mitra intertaeniata G.B. Sowerby II, 1874, with the description of a new Vexillum species (Gastropoda: Costellariidae). Visaya 2(4): 16–51. [Published June 2009] page(s): 23

External links
 
 Reeve, L. A. (1844-1845). Monograph of the genus Mitra. In: Conchologia Iconica, or, illustrations of the shells of molluscous animals, vol. 2, pl. 1-39 and unpaginated text. L. Reeve & Co., London.
  Liénard, Élizé. Catalogue de la faune malacologique de l'île Maurice et de ses dépendances comprenant les îles Seychelles, le groupe de Chagos composé de Diego-Garcia, Six-îles, Pèros-Banhos, Salomon, etc., l'île Rodrigues, l'île de Cargados ou Saint-Brandon. J. Tremblay, 1877.
  Cernohorsky, Walter Oliver. The Mitridae of Fiji; The veliger vol. 8 (1965)

deshayesii
Gastropods described in 1845